The Solicitor General of the State is a senior official of the Ministry of Justice. The Spanish Solicitor General is the person in charge of directing the Legal Service of the Spanish Government and its relationship with all kinds of national or foreign organisms, entities and bodies. As head of the Legal Service is in charge of the representation and defense of the Kingdom of Spain before the courts, organs and international or supranational organisms in which it is a party in any jurisdictional, arbitral or extrajudicial proceedings. Likewise, it is also responsible for advising the Government and the organs of the Administration about issues of legality.

The Solicitor General is nominated by the Minister of Justice and appointed by the Council of Ministers. To be appointed Solicitor General its needed first to be a State Solicitor. According to the law, in case of vacancy, absence or illness, it is the Minister of Justice who decides who should substitute him, if he do not do so, the law establishes that the senior deputy director-general must to replace him, in this case it would be the Deputy Director-General of Advisory Services.

Solicitor General's Office
The Solicitor General's Office, officially called Solicitor General's Office-Directorate of the State Legal Service (Abogacía General del Estado-Dirección del Servicio Jurídico del Estado) is a Ministry of Justice department which assumes the direction of the State Legal Service, in such concept, corresponds to it the direction, coordination and inspection of the services entrusted to State Solicitors and State Attorneys, ensuring in all cases the maintenance of the principle of unity of doctrine in the exercise of the powers attributed to them.

The Solicitor General's Office is assisted by a Cabinet, five deputy director-generals, a Secretary General and the different offices of the State Solicitor's before courts and other bodies, namely:
 Solicitor General's Cabinet, officially called Solicitor's Office in the Ministry of Justice-Cabinet of the Solicitor General of the State which is responsible for the legal advice in the matters that may affect the State Legal Service, its organization and functioning as well as the legal advisement of the different departments of the Ministry of Justice.
 Deputy Director-General of Advisory Services, which is responsible for the legal advise of the General State Administration and its different bodies, including State-owned companies, as well as giving legal advice to the autonomous communities and local administrations.
 Deputy Director-General of Contentious Services, which is responsible for the representation and defense of the State and its autonomous agencies, as well as other public bodies and entities; state-owned companies and foundations with state participation; autonomous communities, local administrations and the constitutional bodies before any jurisdictions and jurisdictional organs, to the conflicts of jurisdiction and conflicts and questions of competence and to the preliminary and extrajudicial procedures in which the State is interested. It also corresponds to give legal advice on claims prior to the civil and labor court, in cases in which the opinion of the deputy general directorate is requested, and of the files for the payment of costs to be condemned by the State when it arises controversy. Likewise, it is responsible for ensuring the effectiveness of the principle of unity of doctrine in the scope of contentious functions, formulating general criteria for action in the trial for Solicitor and State Attorneys.
 Deputy Director-General for European Union and International Affairs, which is responsible for the representation and defense of the Kingdom of Spain before the judicial bodies of the European Union and before the International Criminal Court. It also has competences, in coordination with the Ministry of Foreign Affairs, in legal assistance in the infringement proceedings opened by the European Commission against Spain. It also offers legal assistance in the field of European Union law.
 Deputy Director-General of Coordination, Audit and Knowledge Management, which is responsible for the coordination of relations between State Solicitors Offices that perform advisory functions and State Solicitors Offices that perform contentious functions. Likewise, it corresponds to this Deputy General Directorate the promotion of research works and the organization of activities aimed at the knowledge and dissemination of legal issues of national or international scope, as well as the organization of training and improvement activities for the civil servants of the State Lawyers Corps.
 Deputy Director-General for Constitutional and Human Rights, which is responsible for the representation and defense of the State and its autonomous agencies as well as other bodies of the State in trial before the Constitutional Court. In the same way, it will develop the advice on procedural or substantive issues derived from the approach or processing of constitutional procedures; as well as, in particular, the advice, when requested by the Government or any of its members, on the constitutionality of the draft bills of any rank that have to be submitted for approval, and the legal examination and report, to petition of the Government or of any of its members, of the dispositions or resolutions of the autonomous communities that may be challenged before the Constitutional Court. Its also in charge of the representation of Spain before the European Court of Human Rights and the legal advise about European Convention on Human Rights issues and the legal advise about any other international treaty about human rights signed by Spain.

In the Office exists also a General Secretariat, an assistance body of the Solicitor General about administrative, economic and human resources matters.

Are also part of the Office, and depend directly from the Solicitor General:
 The Solicitor's Office before the Supreme Court.
 The Solicitor's Office before the National Court.
 The Solicitor's Office before the Court of Auditors.
 The Solicitor's Office in the different government departments.
 The Solicitor's Office in the different bodies of the Administration.

Council of State Solicitors
The Council of State Solicitors is a support body of the Solicitor General of the State formed by the Solicitor General and other eight State Solicitors that are appointed or removed by the Solicitor General.

The law requires that at least one of the State Solicitors is destinated to the consultive services of the State Legal Service, other to the contentious services and other to the peripheral administration (it's the decentralize administration of the State). The term of this members are 3 years and can be renewed.

The Council has as duties the assistance and functional support to the Solicitor General, at the request of the latter, in matters that he considers of particular relevance or that entail new criteria and guidelines for the action of State Solicitors and the issuance of non-binding reports, if requested by the Solicitor General, with the nature of adopting the most relevant provisions for the internal functioning of the State Legal Service.

History
The Solicitor General in spanish have received many names. In the year of its creation, 1849, the Solicitor General received the name of Director-General of the Contentious of the Ministry of the Treasury or Director-General of the Contentious of the Public Treasury. This denomination was maintained until 1854 when start to be called General Advisor of the Ministry of Finance until 1877 when recovered its original name by being called Director-General of the Contentious of the State.

It remained that way until 1985, when the office was renamed Director-General of the State Legal Service. The current name of the office was established in 2000 being officially called Solicitor General of the State-Director of the State Legal Service although to simplify is called only Solicitor General of the State.

In its origins, the Solicitor General depended on the Minister of the Treasury and required that they be students of law, administrative science and have experience in the practice of the business of the Public Treasury. Its functions were limited to the powers of the Ministry of Finance and were responsible for issuing legal reports and supervising the prosecutors' actions in the courts.

In the reform of 1881, that the State Solicitors assumed the two functions that they have today, the advisory function and the contentious function, in addition to the representation function.

List of Solicitors General

 Status

References

Notes

Government of Spain
Spanish lawyers
Judiciary of Spain